Changizi may refer to

 pertaining to Mughal tribe
 pertaining to Genghis Khan
 Mark Changizi, an evolutionary neurobiologist
 Sarnaveh Changizi, a village in Boluran Rural District, Darb-e Gonbad District, Kuhdasht County, Lorestan Province, Iran